Mandalay FM is a radio station that serves the Mandalay metropolitan area (90 miles around Mandalay), broadcasting on the FM band at a frequency of 87.9 MHz and on the Internet. Now the radio station is also serving  around Taungoo and  around Yangon.

Mandalay FM radio will be able to tuned along the Yangon-Mandalay Highway in December. It is operated by the city government, MCDC, FM is one of two radio stations available in Mandalay. Mandalay's sole FM station employs a pop culture-oriented format with a focus on Burmese and English pop music, entertainment programs, live celebrity interviews, etc., offering an alternative to the propaganda-laden programming of the state-run Myanmar Radio National Service.

The station is a joint venture between MCDC and Forever Group, one of the country's few multimedia companies with close ties to the country's military government.

References

External links
 
 

Radio stations in Myanmar
Mass media in Mandalay
2008 establishments in Myanmar